Henry John Corbett Taylor (born 16 April 1949) is an English former first-class cricketer.

Taylor was born at Solihull in April 1965 and was educated there at Solihull School, before going up to Jesus College, Cambridge. While studying at Cambridge, he played first-class cricket for Cambridge University Cricket Club in 1968 and 1969, making 13 appearances. He scored 246 runs in his 13 matches, at an average of 10.25. His one half century, a score of exactly 50, came against Leicestershire in 1968, as part of a stand of 80 for the eighth wicket with Anthony Palfreman.

References

External links

1949 births
Living people
Sportspeople from Solihull
People educated at Solihull School
Alumni of Jesus College, Cambridge
English cricketers
Cambridge University cricketers